Al-Nejmeh, Arabic for "the Star", may refer to:
Nejmeh SC, a Lebanese football club
Al-Najma SC, a Bahraini multi-sports club
Al-Najma SC, an Iraqi football club
Al-Najma SC, a Saudi Arabian football club
Annajma SC, a Libyan football club